Manuel Prieguez (born February 24, 1971) is an American politician. He served as a Republican member for the 113th district of the Florida House of Representatives.

Prieguez was born in Miami, Florida. He attended Florida International University, where he earned a bachelor's degree in 1993.

In 1998 Prieguez was elected for the 113th district of the Florida House of Representatives, serving until 2004.

References 

1971 births
People from Miami
Politicians from Miami
Republican Party members of the Florida House of Representatives
20th-century American politicians
21st-century American politicians
Florida International University alumni
Living people
Hispanic and Latino American state legislators in Florida
American politicians of Cuban descent